Alangium havilandii is a tree in the dogwood family Cornaceae. It is named for the British surgeon and naturalist George Darby Haviland.

Description
The smooth bark is greyish.

Distribution and habitat
Alangium havilandii is endemic to Borneo. Its habitat is lowland peat swamp forest.

References

havilandii
Trees of Borneo
Endemic flora of Borneo
Plants described in 1935
Taxonomy articles created by Polbot